Belvidere School or Belvidere High School may refer to:

 Belvidere School, Shrewsbury, Shropshire, England
 Belvidere High School (Illinois), United States
 Belvidere High School (New Jersey), United States

See also
 Belvidere (disambiguation)
 Belvidere High School (disambiguation)